The Sergeant John F. Baker Jr. Bridge, also known as the Baker Bridge or  Interstate 280 Bridge, carries Interstate 280 (I-280) across the Mississippi River between Davenport, Iowa, and Rock Island, Illinois. The bridge opened in 1973 with a blue and yellow color scheme, thought to be unique in the state.  In 2007, it was repainted all blue.  On July 30, 2010, the bridge was officially named the  Sergeant John F. Baker Jr. Bridge.

On May 2, 2019, the bridge, along with several other bridges in the Quad Cities area, were temporarily closed to all traffic due to severe flooding of the Mississippi River and the Rock River, and a subsequent levee breach in Davenport.

See also
 
 
 
 
 List of crossings of the Upper Mississippi River

References

Road bridges in Illinois
Bridges over the Mississippi River
Buildings and structures in Rock Island, Illinois
Transportation in Davenport, Iowa
Bridges completed in 1973
Bridges on the Interstate Highway System
Tied arch bridges in the United States
Buildings and structures in Davenport, Iowa
Bridges in Rock Island County, Illinois
Bridges in Scott County, Iowa
Bridges in the Quad Cities
Road bridges in Iowa
Interstate 80
Interstate vehicle bridges in the United States